GPUGRID is a volunteer computing project hosted by Pompeu Fabra University and running on the Berkeley Open Infrastructure for Network Computing (BOINC) software platform. It performs full-atom molecular biology simulations that are designed to run on Nvidia's CUDA-compatible graphics processing units.

Former support for PS3s 

Support for the PS3's Cell microprocessor and the subsequent PS3GRID project was dropped in 2009 due to updated firmware preventing the installation of required third party software. This included Linux distributions that are required to run BOINC. The massive throughput of Nvidia GPUs has also made the PS3 client largely redundant. As of September 2009, a mid-range Nvidia GPU ran GPUGRID applications approximately five times faster than the Cell microprocessor.

See also 
 List of volunteer computing projects
 Molecular dynamics
 GPGPU

References

Further reading 

 Research topics in GPUGRID website's science sections
 GPUGRID's about us section

External links 
 
 Berkeley Open Infrastructure for Network Computing (BOINC)

 Science in society
Free science software
Volunteer computing projects